Frenchtown may refer to:

In the United States:
 Frenchtown, California (disambiguation)
 Frenchtown, El Dorado County, California
 Frenchtown, Yuba County, California
 Frenchtown (Tallahassee), a section of the city of Tallahassee, Florida
 Frenchtown, Indiana
 Frenchtown, Maryland (disambiguation)
 Frenchtown, Cecil County, Maryland
 Frenchtown (Perryville, Maryland)
 Frenchtown-Rumbly, Maryland
 Frenchtown Charter Township, Michigan
 Battle of Frenchtown, 1813
 French Town, Missouri
 Frenchtown, Montana
 Frenchtown Township, Antelope County, Nebraska
 Frenchtown, New Jersey
 Frenchtown, Darke County, Ohio
 Frenchtown, Seneca County, Ohio
 Frenchtown, Pennsylvania
 Frenchtown, a section of the Fifth Ward in Houston, Texas
 Frenchtown, United States Virgin Islands
 A distinct neighborhood in Tomahawk, Wisconsin
Frenchtown, Washington

See also 
 Frenchtown Historic District
 Frenchtown Township (disambiguation)
 Frenchtown High School, Frenchtown, Montana, United States
 Frenchtown School District, Frenchtown, New Jersey, United States
 French Quarter (disambiguation)
 French Settlement (disambiguation)
 French Concession